Haggerston Baths in Hackney, London, was opened in 1904 as public baths. The baths were built at a cost of £60,000. There was a single pool, 91 slipper baths and a 60 stall wash house.

The Grade II listed Haggerston Pool was designed by Alfred Cross. It was closed in 2000 with an uncertain future. In June 2009 after a long community campaign, a £5m grant was announced from the Department for Children, Schools and Families to refurbish and re-open the pool. The building would also contain community facilities and a GP surgery. Heavily involved in the re-opening of the pool was Michael Gallie, who was instrumental in surveying the building, creating 3D model sketches and more.

Due to the 2009 financial downturn the council had to remove funding for the re-opening of the baths. The Haggerston baths campaign restarted efforts to find financial backing and public support in an effort to re-open the pool.

As of January 2023 it appears that any restoration of the building will no longer include restoring the swimming baths.

See also 
Haggerston
Dulwich Baths
Camberwell Baths

References

External links
 

1904 establishments in England
2000 disestablishments in England
Former public baths
Grade II listed buildings in the London Borough of Hackney
Public baths in the United Kingdom
Haggerston